Jhilariya is a village in Rajkot district in the Indian state of Gujarat. It is located near Makaji Meghpar.

Administration 

Jhilariya Gram Panchayat is the local self-government of the village. The panchayat has a total of 10 wards and each ward is represented by an elected ward member. The ward members are headed by a sarpanch.

References 

Villages in Rajkot district